Solnechnodolsk is an urban locality (a settlement) in Izobilnensky District of Stavropol Krai, Russia, located on the Yegorlyk River. Population:

References

Urban-type settlements in Stavropol Krai